Austropyrgus centralia is a species of minute freshwater snail with an operculum, an aquatic gastropod mollusc or micromollusc in the Hydrobiidae family. This species is endemic to northern South Australia. It is only known from a few small seeps and the shallow lower outflow of one larger spring in Dalhousie Springs, Lake Eyre basin.

See also 
 List of non-marine molluscs of Australia

References

Further reading

External links

Hydrobiidae
Austropyrgus
Endemic fauna of Australia
Gastropods of Australia
Gastropods described in 1996